WLSP-LP (103.5 FM) is a community radio station in the city of Sun Prairie, Wisconsin. The station, which went on air in 2015, broadcasts a mix of local programming and music chosen by local DJs.

See also
List of community radio stations in the United States

References

External links
Official website

LSP-LP
Community radio stations in the United States
Radio stations established in 2015
2015 establishments in Wisconsin
LSP-LP